The Long Ride Home is a 2003 American Western film directed by Rob Marcarelli and starring Randy Travis, Eric Roberts, Ernest Borgnine and Vaughn Taylor (who wrote the screenplay).

Plot
In 1866 New Mexico, a man going by the pseudonym Jack Cole, a famous gunman, is shot by a man hiding in the bushes. Jack's horse takes him to the home of Laura Fowler and her son Daniel, who nurse Jack back to health. Deputy Abel Hart arrives at the Fowler home seeking Jack, but Laura suspects that he's a fraud and claims that she hasn't seen Jack.

Laura later takes Jack aside and it is revealed that Jack is her long-lost husband, Jack Fowler, who left Laura eight years ago prior to Daniel being born. Daniel overhears the conversation and asks Jack about his past without revealing that he knows who he is. Jack tells how eight years ago he was confused for the real Jack Cole, an evil gunman, who killed several members of the Moat family, and was forced to kill a man to save himself. Now the head of the Moat family, Lucas, is after him.

Laura's fiancé, Sheriff Hank Bowman, is suspicious of Jack and gets into a fistfight with him, leading Jack to decide to move on to somewhere else. Angered, Daniel runs away. Hart returns and attacks Laura, who Jack tends to after finding her passed out in the barn. Hart kidnaps Daniel and reveals that he is the real Jack Cole, who spent eight years in jail before escaping and going after Jack Fowler for stealing his name and reputation. He leaves Daniel tied up as "bait" to catch Jack.

Jack Fowler goes on a search for Daniel, but Hart returns to Laura's home and she flees. Daniel is rescued by Lucas Moat and his two sons, but he returns to his home to see if Laura has been harmed, where Hart is waiting and holds Daniel overnight. The next morning, Jack and Laura arrive again and attempt to save Daniel. Lucas arrives with his sons and Hart shoots at them, leading to Lucas being fatally injured. The Moat sons shoot Hart and kill him, while Lucas dies relieved that he finally caught Hart, and is assured that God has forgiven him by Daniel.

Jack Fowler, now free to stop fleeing, lives with Laura again, and Bowman (who discovered Hart's true identity via a telegram the night before), although still somewhat jealous, accepts the situation and leaves happily.

Cast
Randy Travis as Jack Fowler / Jack Cole
Eric Roberts as Sheriff Hank Bowman
Ernest Borgnine as Lucas Moat
Vaughn Taylor as Laura Fowler
Paul Tinder as Deputy Hart
Alec Medlock as Daniel Fowler
Steve Nave as Caleb Moat
Jeff McGrail as Kyle Moat
Garry Marshall as Arthur
Michele Dalcin as Miriam
Stella Stevens as Fiona Champyon
Rance Howard as Old man
Jerry Doyle as Sheriff
Jeff Dolan as Deputy
Sam Dolan as Billy
Peter Sherayko as Father Thadeus
Sal Cardile as Gustis
Larry A. Zeug as Prisoner #1
Dan Erwin as Cousin Larry
Elizabeth Tinder as Maid
Greg Stanina as Rancher

References

External links
 
 

Latin-language films
American Western (genre) films
Lionsgate films
2000s English-language films
2000s American films